Clara Obligado Marcó del Pont (born 1950) is an Argentine-Spanish writer.

Biography
Clara Obligado holds a licentiate in Literature from the Pontifical Catholic University of Argentina. Since 1976 she has lived in Madrid, a political exile of the Argentine regime known as the National Reorganization Process, and has Spanish citizenship.

She was one of the first people who began to give creative writing workshops, both independently and at the National University of Distance Education, the Círculo de Bellas Artes, and the bookstore Mujeres de Madrid, among many other institutions. In 1978 she founded the Creative Writing Workshop of Clara Obligado, one of the centers of this discipline with the longest standing in Spain and which she currently directs, teaching courses both live and at a distance.

According to Juan Casamayor, editor of Páginas de Espuma (a publishing house specializing in the genre), Clara Obligado was the introducer of the micro-story in Spain, through her literary workshops.

In 1996 she received the Lumen Women's Award for her novel La hija de Marx. She is also the author of the novels Si un hombre vivo te hace llorar, No le digas que lo quieres, and Salsa.

In her essay books she has addressed topics related to women and culture, as in her work Mujeres a contracorriente.

In 2012 she won the Setenil Award with her short story book El libro de los viajes equivocados, and in 2015 the Juan March Cencillo Short Novel Award with Petrarca para viajeros.

Works

Novels
 La hija de Marx, Editorial Lumen, 1996, reissued in 2013 by Galerna
 Si un hombre vivo te hace llorar, Editorial Planeta, 1998, translated into Greek
 No le digas que lo quieres, Editorial Anaya, 2002
 Salsa, Editorial Plaza y Janés, 2002, published in audio form in the United States
 Petrarca para viajeros, Editorial Pretextos, 2015

Short stories

Anthologies and collaborations
 Sobre Morpios y otros cuentos, with Miguel Argibay, Antonio Calvo Roy, and Patricio Olivera; José Matesanz Editor, Trasgos de Metro collection, Madrid, 1982
Temas de Hoy, 1990
 "El cazador", in: Mujeres al alba, Editorial Alfaguara, Madrid, 1999, pp. 107-122
 Manjares económicos, in collaboration with Mariángeles Fernández, Ed. Alianza.
 Deseos de mujer, in collaboration with Carmen Posadas, Mariángeles Fernández, and Pilar Rodríguez, Ed. Plaza y Janés

Microfiction anthologies
 Por favor, sea breve 1 and 2 (Ed. Clara Obligado). Editorial Páginas de Espuma, Madrid, 2001 and 2009

Story books
 Una mujer en la cama y otros cuentos, Catriel, Madrid, 1990
 Las otras vidas, Editorial Páginas de Espuma, Madrid, 2006
 El libro de los viajes equivocados, Editorial Páginas de Espuma, Madrid, 2011
 La muerte juega a los dados, Editorial Páginas de Espuma, Madrid, 2015

Editor of works by new authors
 Qué mala suerte tengo con los hombres (Ed. Clara Obligado), Catriel, Madrid, 1997
 Cuentos para leer en el metro (Ed. Clara Obligado), Catriel, Madrid, 1999
 Historias de amor y desamor (Ed. Clara Obligado), Trivium, Madrid, 2001
 Jonás y las palabras difíciles (Ed. Clara Obligado), Ed. Taller de Escritura Creativa, Madrid
 La Isla (Ed. Clara Obligado) Ed. Taller de Escritura Creativa, Madrid

Others
 Cartas eróticas, essay, with Ángel Zapata, Temas de Hoy, Madrid, 1993
 Manjares económicos: cocina para literatos, golosos y viajeros, with Mariángeles Fernández, Editorial Alianza, Madrid, 1995
 Qué se ama cuando se ama, with illustrations by Pat Andrea, Ed. Ovejas al lobo, Madrid, 1997
 Qué me pongo, essay, Editorial Plaza y Janés, Madrid, 2000
 Estética de la exclusión, essay, in: En sus propias palabras: Escritoras españolas ante el mercado literario, Henseler, Christine (ed.), Madrid: Torremozas, 2003, pp. 77-96
 Mujeres a contracorriente. La otra mitad de la historia, essay, Plaza y Janés, Madrid, 2004; expanded edition: Sudamericana, Buenos Aires, 2005, translated into French by Ed. Lattes
 ¿De qué se ríe la Gioconda? o ¿Por qué la vida de las mujeres no está en el arte?, essay, Editorial Temas de hoy, Madrid, 2006
 Deseos de mujer, with Mariángeles Fernández, Carmen Posadas, and Pilar Rodríguez, Plaza y Janés, Madrid, 2008
 "Viaje al centro de los libros",  prologue of the anthology La distancia exacta. Cuentos sobre el viaje, Editorial Fin de Viaje, Baza (Granada), 2013

Awards
 Lumen Women's Novel Award, for La hija de Marx, Barcelona, 1996
 Finalist for the 2nd Premio de Narrativa Breve Ribera del Duero, for El libro de los viajes equivocados, 2011
 Setenil Award, for El libro de los viajes equivocados, 2012
 Juan March Cencillo Short Novel Award, for Petrarca para viajeros, 2015

References

External links
  

1950 births
20th-century Argentine women writers
20th-century Argentine writers
20th-century Spanish women writers
21st-century Argentine women writers
21st-century Argentine writers
21st-century Spanish women writers
Argentine exiles
Argentine expatriates in Spain
Argentine women essayists
Argentine essayists
Argentine women novelists
Argentine women short story writers
Living people
Pontifical Catholic University of Argentina alumni
Writers from Buenos Aires